Pilgrim Hot Springs is a ghost town in the interior of the Seward Peninsula of northwestern Arctic Alaska. The location gained prominence in the early 20th century because of its thermal hot springs, which made agricultural homesteading possible, and which were adapted to provide a respite for the gold miners of Nome. Early buildings, built 1900–03, were of log construction, and included a log cabin, barn and chicken house. A roadhouse and saloon were built after 1903, but were destroyed by fire in 1908, after the mining boom had ended.

After the flu epidemic of 1918, the Roman Catholic Diocese of Nome built a large orphanage at the site, complete with a large church, dormitory and school, and living quarters for the staff, as well as greenhouses.  These facilities were kept warm by water piped from the hot springs.  The site was closed in 1941, but soon reopened as a recreational facility for the military, serving until the end of World War II.  When surveyed in 1977 prior to listing on the National Register of Historic Places, the buildings on the site were in deteriorated condition.  The site is owned by Unaataq LLC, a consortium of area Alaska native corporations which is working on development alternatives for the site, including power generation and tourism.

Demographics

Pilgrim Hot Springs only appeared on the 1940 U.S. Census as the unincorporated village of "Pilgrim Springs." It was reported that it was an "all-Eskimo" settlement at that time. It has not appeared on the census since.

See also
National Register of Historic Places listings in Nome Census Area, Alaska

References

Buildings and structures completed in 1903
Buildings and structures in Nome Census Area, Alaska
Hot springs of Alaska
Orphanages in the United States
Properties of religious function on the National Register of Historic Places in Alaska
Roman Catholic Diocese of Fairbanks
Buildings and structures on the National Register of Historic Places in Nome Census Area, Alaska
Unincorporated communities in Nome Census Area, Alaska